Epiphthora is a genus of moths in the family Gelechiidae.

Species
Epiphthora achnias Meyrick, 1904
Epiphthora acrocola Turner, 1927
Epiphthora acropasta Turner, 1919
Epiphthora anisaula (Meyrick, 1921)
Epiphthora autoleuca Meyrick, 1904
Epiphthora belonodes Meyrick, 1904
Epiphthora chionocephala (Lower, 1901)
Epiphthora coniombra Meyrick, 1904
Epiphthora cryolopha Meyrick, 1904
Epiphthora delochorda Lower, 1918
Epiphthora dinota (Turner, 1933)
Epiphthora drosias Meyrick, 1904
Epiphthora harpastis Meyrick, 1904
Epiphthora hyperaenicta Turner, 1927
Epiphthora hexagramma (Meyrick, 1921)
Epiphthora isonira Meyrick, 1904
Epiphthora lemurella Meyrick, 1904
Epiphthora leptoconia Turner, 1919
Epiphthora leucomichla Meyrick, 1904
Epiphthora megalornis Meyrick, 1904
Epiphthora melanombra Meyrick, 1888
Epiphthora miarodes Meyrick, 1904
Epiphthora microtima Meyrick, 1904
Epiphthora niphaula Meyrick, 1904
Epiphthora nivea (Philpott, 1930)
Epiphthora phantasta Meyrick, 1904
Epiphthora poliopasta Turner, 1919
Epiphthora psychrodes Meyrick, 1904
Epiphthora spectrella Meyrick, 1904
Epiphthora thyellias Meyrick, 1904
Epiphthora zalias (Meyrick, 1922)

References

 
Apatetrini